Andrijauskas is a Lithuanian language family name. It may refer to:
Antanas Andrijauskas, Lithuanian culturologist
Paulius Andrijauskas,  Lithuanian swimmer
Marius Andrijauskas, Lithianian national rugby player
Lina Andrijauskaitė, Lithuanian athlete
Fabio Andrijauskas, Brazilian researcher

Lithuanian-language surnames